Ocean Park is an abandoned Staten Island Railway station in the neighborhood of Annadale, Staten Island, New York. The station was a flag stop and was located between Annadale and Huguenot. The station is listed as being open in 1889 and 1890. This station was not listed on a map from 1889.

References 

Defunct Staten Island Railway stations